Vieng Narumon (born 11 January 1992) is a Thai luk thung and Mor lam singer from the Isan area. She has been an artist with Grammy Gold (GMM Grammy) since 2017. Her popular songs include "Wai Ok Hak", "Ngiw Tong Ton Humhon Phoo Bao Kaw" and "Ka Khon Bor Huk Kan".

Early life
She was born into a family of mor lam singers in Roi Et Province. She is a daughter of Suwarna Pholphuttha (died in 2020). She finished her education at Bunditpatanasilpa Institute. She is a niece of Roi-et Phetsiam who was a famous Mor lam singer in the 1960s.

Musical career 
She started to dance with her father's music band when she studied in primary 5. After that, she got to sing and dance under Nok Aing Mong band. She trained with National Artist of Thailand in 1993, Chaweewan Damnuen. She met with Mor lam songwriter, Amphai Maniwong and Amphai who took her to Sala Khunnawut for recording in Grammy Gold's project Nong Mai Tai Daw: Project II. Her first single was "Huk Bor Dai Tae Luem Ai Bor Long" (ฮักบ่ได้แต่ลืมอ้ายบ่ลง), so she registered as an artist in Grammy Gold since then.

Her other songs include "Wai Ok Hak", "Won Pu Lum Khong", "Huk Laew Kue Bor Huk Loei". In 2018, she collaborated with Beer Promphong on the singles "Rewatta Hukna Leelawadee" and "Rewatta La Huk". In 2021, she was popularized by the single "Ngiw Tong Ton Humhon Phoo Bao Kaw" (งิ้วต่องต้อนฮำฮอนผู้บ่าวเก่า) which has the same melody as "Ngiw Tong Ton" by Banyen Rakgan. In addition, she wrote and sang with herself on the single "Ka Khon Bor Huk Kan". She very successful in 2022 with her single My Old Boyfriend (Returned) (แฟนเก่ากลับใจ).

Partial Discography

Studio Album

Singles

References

External links
 

1992 births
Living people
21st-century Thai women singers
Thai mor lam musicians
People from Roi Et province